Armando Santos Marcelo (born 25 May 1988) is a Mexican professional boxer who won the NABF flyweight title in 2013.

Professional career
Santos rose to prominence with an initial 7-1 record, mostly fighting in his hometown Mexico City. He then traveled to Tokyo, where he lost by unanimous decision to future WBC and The Ring flyweight champion Toshiyuki Igarashi on November 6, 2010.

His next tough loss came on June 17, 2011, where he lost by UD against Carlos Cuadras, coincidentally a future WBC super flyweight champion himself.

Santos won his next two fights, and subsequently received his first title shot. He knocked Herald Molina out in the second round on May 25, 2013 in León, Guanajuato for the vacant NABF flyweight championship.

He won the minor WBC–USNBC flyweight title three months later in Toluca, when he defeated Roilo Golez by UD.

Santos also captured the IBF International flyweight title in February 2014, after beating the EBU flyweight champion, Silviu Olteanu by majority decision in Mexico City.

Professional boxing record

| style="text-align:center;" colspan="8"|14 Wins (8 knockouts, 6 decisions),  5 Losses (2 knockouts, 3 decisions), 1 Draws
|-  style="text-align:center; background:#e3e3e3;"
|  style="border-style:none none solid solid; "|Res.
|  style="border-style:none none solid solid; "|Record
|  style="border-style:none none solid solid; "|Opponent
|  style="border-style:none none solid solid; "|Type
|  style="border-style:none none solid solid; "|Rd., Time
|  style="border-style:none none solid solid; "|Date
|  style="border-style:none none solid solid; "|Location
|  style="border-style:none none solid solid; "|Notes
|- align=center
|Loss
|align=center|14–5–1||align=left| Cesar Javier Gandara
|
|
|
|align=left|
|align=left|
|- align=center
|Loss
|align=center|14–4–1||align=left| Johnriel Casimero
|
|
|
|align=left|
|align=left|
|- align=center
|style="background: #B0C4DE"| Draw
|align=center|14–3–1||align=left| Javier Franco
|
|
|
|align=left|
|align=left|
|- align=center
|Win
|align=center|14–3||align=left| Silviu Olteanu
|
|
|
|align=left|
|align=left|
|- align=center
|Win
|align=center|13–3||align=left| Juan Jiménez
|
|
|
|align=left|
|align=left|
|- align=center
|Win
|align=center|12–3||align=left| Roilo Golez
|
|
|
|align=left|
|align=left|
|- align=center
|Win
|align=center|11–3||align=left| Herald Molina
|
|
|
|align=left|
|align=left|
|- align=center
|Win
|align=center|10–3||align=left| Edgar Gonzalez
|
|
|
|align=left|
|align=left|
|- align=center
|Win
|align=center|9–3||align=left| Omar Lina
|
|
|
|align=left|
|align=left|
|- align=center
|Loss
|align=center|8–3||align=left| Carlos Cuadras
|
|
|
|align=left|
|align=left|
|- align=center
|Win
|align=center|8–2||align=left| Miguel Angel Chi
|
|
|
|align=left|
|align=left|
|- align=center
|Loss
|align=center|7–2||align=left| Toshiyuki Igarashi
|
|
|
|align=left|
|align=left|
|- align=center
|Win
|align=center|7–1||align=left| Miguel Garcia
|
|
|
|align=left|
|align=left|
|- align=center
|Win
|align=center|6–1||align=left| Angel Aguilar
|
|
|
|align=left|
|align=left|
|- align=center
|Win
|align=center|5–1||align=left| Jesús Periban
|
|
|
|align=left|
|align=left|
|- align=center
|Win
|align=center|4–1||align=left| Felipe Jimenez
|
|
|
|align=left|
|align=left|
|- align=center
|Win
|align=center|3–1||align=left| Geovani Vargas
|
|
|
|align=left|
|align=left|
|- align=center
|Win
|align=center|2–1||align=left| Cesar Rojas
|
|
|
|align=left|
|align=left|
|- align=center
|Loss
|align=center|1–1||align=left| Arturo Zamora
|
|
|
|align=left|
|align=left|
|- align=center
|Win
|align=center|1–0|| align=left| Alan Barron
|
|
|
|align=left|
|align=left|

References

External links
 

1988 births
Living people
Mexican male boxers
Boxers from Mexico City
Flyweight boxers